The Outer Islands of Mauritius is the first-level administrative divisions of the country and consists of the islands of Mauritius and several outlying islands. It is under the responsibility of the Ministry of Local Government and Outer Islands. The Constitution of Mauritius states that the Republic of Mauritius includes the islands of Agaléga, Mauritius, Rodrigues, Saint Brandon (Cargados Carajos), Tromelin Island, and the Chagos Archipelago (including Diego Garcia and other associated islands). The Government of Mauritius claims sovereignty over the Chagos Archipelago, which the United Kingdom split from its territories to create the British Indian Ocean Territory before its independence in 1968. Additionally, France shares a sovereignty claim over Tromelin Island, an uninhabited island between Madagascar and Mauritius's main island.

Territory 

The total area of the Republic of Mauritius is 2,040 km2 (excluding the Chagos Archipelago), making it the 169th largest country in the world by area. Mauritian territory also incorporates the island of Rodrigues, which is situated some 560 kilometers to the east and is 104 km2 in area. Rodrigues used to be the country's tenth district, before it gained autonomous status in 2002. The two islands of Agaléga have a total land area of 2,600 hectares and are situated some 1,000 km to the north of Mauritius. Saint Brandon (Cargados Carajos) is situated some 430 km to the north-east of Mauritius; it is an archipelago comprising a number of sand banks, shoals, and islets. Just off the Mauritian coast lie some 49 tiny uninhabited islands and islets (see: Islets of Mauritius), some of which are used as natural reserves for the protection of endangered species.

The country's exclusive economic zone (EEZ) covers about 2.3 million km2 of the Indian Ocean, including approximately 400,000 km2 jointly
managed with Seychelles. Four fishing banks fall within its EEZ limits: Hawkins Bank, Nazareth Bank, the Saya de Malha Bank, and the Soudan Banks (including East Soudan Bank). In 2011, the United Nations endorsed the joint submission of Mauritius and Seychelles to extend their continental shelf of 396,000 km2 in the Mascarene region which gives the two countries sovereign right to jointly manage and exploit the seabed and subsoil of the joint area.

See also

 Chagos Archipelago sovereignty dispute
 Districts of Mauritius
 Geography of Mauritius
 ISO 3166-2:MU
 List of places in Mauritius
 Saint Brandon

References

External links 
 Chagos Archipelago and Tromelin Island – Mauritius Sovereignty (National Assembly of Mauritius)

 
Subdivisions of Mauritius
Mauritius 1
Lists of administrative divisions
Mauritius geography-related lists